Lullaby for Pi is a 2010 English-language Canadian-French drama film written and directed by Benoit Philippon and starring Rupert Friend, Clemence Poesy and Forest Whitaker.  It is Philippon's directorial debut.

Plot

An unusual courtship begins when a musician, who is still grieving the death of his lover, meets a quirky artist.

Cast
Rupert Friend as Sam
Clémence Poésy as Pi
Matt Ward as William
Forest Whitaker as George
Sarah Wayne Callies as Josephine
Colin Lawrence as Jack
Dewshane Williams as Mo
Charlie Winston as himself

References

External links
 
 

Canadian drama films
French drama films
2010 directorial debut films
2010 films
Films produced by Christine Vachon
2010 drama films
English-language Canadian films
English-language French films
2010s English-language films
2010s Canadian films
2010s French films